The 1996–97 Northern Counties East Football League season was the 15th in the history of Northern Counties East Football League, a football competition in England.

Premier Division

The Premier Division featured 18 clubs which competed in the previous season, along with two new clubs, promoted from Division One:
Pontefract Collieries
Selby Town

Also, Maltby Miners Welfare changed name to Maltby Main.

League table

Division One

Division One featured 14 clubs which competed in the previous season, along with one new club:
Glapwell, joined from the Central Midlands League

League table

External links
 Northern Counties East Football League

1996–97
8